is a Japanese former football player. and current manager Nadeshiko League Div.1 club of NHK Spring Yokohama FC Seagulls.

Playing career
Yoda was born in Hyogo Prefecture on June 25, 1977. After graduating from high school, he joined Japan Football League club Vissel Kobe based in his local in 1996. The club won the 2nd place in 1996 and was promoted to J1 League from 1997. However he could hardly play in the match and left the club end of 1998 season. After 1 year blank, he joined Japan Football League club Yokohama FC in 2000. The club won the champions in 2000 and was promoted to J2 League from 2001. From late 2001, he played for Regional Leagues club Shizuoka FC and Central Kobe. In 2004, he moved to Paraguayan club Fernando la Mora. In October 2004, he returned to Japan and joined JEF United Ichihara (later JEF United Chiba). He played as substitute forward. In 2007, he moved to Regional Leagues club AC Nagano Parceiro. He played as regular player and retired end of 2010 season.

Club statistics

References

External links

1977 births
Living people
Association football people from Hyōgo Prefecture
Japanese footballers
J1 League players
J2 League players
Japan Football League (1992–1998) players
Japan Football League players
Vissel Kobe players
Yokohama FC players
JEF United Chiba players
AC Nagano Parceiro players
Association football forwards